Co-cultural communication theory was built upon the frameworks of muted group theory and standpoint theory. The cornerstone of co-cultural communication theory is muted group theory as proposed in the mid 1970s by Shirley and Edwin Ardener. The Ardeners were cultural anthropologists who made the observation that most other cultural anthropologists practicing ethnography in the field were talking only to the leaders of the cultures, who were by and large adult males. The researchers would then use this data to represent the culture as a whole, leaving out the perspectives of women, children and other groups made voiceless by the cultural hierarchy (S. Ardener, 1975). The Ardeners maintained that groups which function at the top of the society hierarchy determine to a great extent the dominant communication system of the entire society (E. Ardener, 1978). Ardener's 1975 muted group theory also posited that dominant group members formulate a "communication system that support their perception of the world and conceptualized it as the appropriate language for the rest of society".

Communication faculty Stanback and Pearce (1981) referred to these non-dominant groups as "subordinate social groups". They noted 4 ways in which the non-dominant groups tend to communicate with the dominant groups. They also asserted that "From the perspective of the dominant group, the behaviors in each form of communication are appropriate. However, the meaning of these behaviors to the members of the lower-statused group are quite different, making them different forms of communication with different implications for the relations among the groups".

In the study of communication, Stanback and Pearce as well as Kramarae used muted group theory to help explain communication patterns and social representation of non-dominant cultural groups Kramarae (1981) believed that "those experiences unique to subordinate group members often cannot be effectively expressed within the confinements of the dominant communication system". She suggested that people within these groups create alternative forms of communication to articulate their experiences. Although, Kramarae used muted group theory to communications strategies of women she suggested that the framework can be applied with equal validity to a number of dominant/non-dominant relationships (Orbe, 1996).

Kramarae (1981) presented three assumptions of muted group theory as applied to communication between men and women concluding that women traditionally have been muted by a male-dominated communications system. Additionally, Kramarae proposed seven hypotheses originating in muted group theory. Standpoint theory was mainly used as a feminist theoretical framework to explore experiences of women as they participate in and oppose their own subordination, however, (Smith, 1987) suggested that the theory had applications for other subordinate groups. A basic tenet of standpoint theory is that it "seeks to include the experiences of subordinate groups within the process of research inquiry in meaningful ways". In other words, the members of the underrepresented groups become co-researchers.

Theory
The theory of co-cultural communication was introduced in 1996 by Mark Orbe, professor in the School of Communication at Western Michigan University, when he found previously used names for the groups under consideration to have negative connotations. He cites previous studies which looked at the communication styles of different co-cultural groups which were referred to by a variety of terms. Orbe was the first to refer to this type of work as "co-cultural communication theory". Orbe states, "in the past researchers have used a variety of terms to describe co-cultural communication: "intracultural" (Sitaram and Cogdell, 1976); "subordinate", "inferior", "minority" (Stanban and Pearce, 1981); "sub-cultural" (Pearson & Nelson, 1991); (Folb, 1994); and "muted group" (Kramarae, 1981)."

Orbe combined the frameworks of muted group theory with that of standpoint theory to arrive at five fundamental concepts which describe co-cultural theory. Orbe states, "co-cultural theory seeks to uncover the commonalities among co-cultural group members as they function in dominant society while substantiating the vast diversity of experiences between and among groups."

Application
Since the introduction of co-cultural theory in "Laying the foundation for co-cultural communication theory: An inductive approach to studying "non-dominant" communication strategies and the factors that influence them" (1996), Orbe has published two works describing the theory and its use as well as several studies on communication patterns and strategies based on different co-cultural groups.

In Orbe's "A Co-cultural communication approach to intergroup relations" (1997), he provides an overview of co-cultural theory, including an explanation of the process by which co-cultural group members strategically select different communications styles

Orbe (1998a) "Constructing co-cultural theory: an explication of culture, power, and communication", presents the theoretical framework for co-cultural theory including the development of the theory, clarification of the co-cultural communication process, and limitations and future directions for its use. Orbe (1998b) "From the standpoint(s) of traditionally muted groups: Explicating a co-cultural communication theoretical model", in which he designated 9 co-cultural orientations based on the intersections of three communication approaches: Non-assertive, Assertive, and Aggressive with 3 preferred outcomes: Separation, Accommodation and Assimilation.

In 2000, Orbe and C. M. Greer presented a paper: "Recognizing the diversity of lived experience: The utility of co-cultural theory in communication and disabilities research" at the annual meeting of the Central States Communication Association, in Detroit. In 2001, Heuman presented "Multiracial/ethnic identity: A co-cultural approach" during the annual meeting of the Central States Communication Association in Cincinnati. During the same meeting Dixon presented "Naming issues in the future of intercultural communication research: The contributions of Mark Orbe's co-cultural theory".

In 2004, Orbe used co-cultural theory as a foundation to explore the processes by which public dialogue can be facilitated across cultural boundaries. Orbe and Spellers (2005) reflected in this book chapter on the origins of co-cultural theory from the perspectives of their different areas of research as well as point to implications for future work.

Orbe & Lapinski (2007)published the design of a self-report measure of the two components of co-cultural theory, preferred outcome and communication approach, and provides evidence from two studies for the construct validity and reliability of the co-cultural theory scales (C-CTS). 

Ramirez-Sanchez (2008) examines the possibility of applying co-cultural theory to co-cultural groups that are marginalized in a larger co-cultural context and to "offer a complex cultural context to which co-cultural theory can be applied and generate questions that could serve to enrich the analytical scope of co-cultural theory and its implications".

In 2010, Camara and Orbe published the article "Analyzing Strategic Responses to Discriminatory Acts: A Co-Cultural Communicative Investigation" in the Journal of International and Intercultural Communication. Two authors utilized Orbe's (1998) co-cultural theory model of the 9 communication orientations and 26 communication practices to identify how co-cultural group members response to the acts of discrimination. Two authors used qualitative content analysis to code the participants’ stories. The paper also oriented the directions of future research. The 26 communication practices are as follows:

In 2012, Jungmi Jun, an assistant professor of the School of Journalism and Mass Communications, University of South Carolina published her article "Why Are Asian Americans Silent? Asian Americans' Negotiation Strategies for Communicative Discriminations" in the Journal of International and Intercultural Communication. The author utilized Orbe's co-cultural theory model to explore two questions. One is what types of racially discriminatory messages target Asian Americans; another one is what communicative approaches do Asian Americans apply to negotiate those messages. The paper used content analysis to code 176 stories gained through an online survey. The research found that Asian Americans tend to use nonassertive approaches to respond to racially discriminatory messages due to internal/environmental factors including emotional shock and humiliation, a lack of knowledge of proper responses, peer pressure, and strategic intent.

Notes

References
Ardener, E. (1978). Some outstanding problems in the analysis of events. In. G. Schwinner, (Ed.), The yearbook of symbolic anthropology. pp. 103–121. London: Hurst.
Ardener, S. (1975). Perceiving Women. London: Malaby Press.
Camara, S. K. & Orbe, M. P. (2010). Analyzing strategic responses to discriminatory acts: A co-cultural communicative investigation. Journal of International and Intercultural Communication, 3(2), 83–113.
Dixon, L. D. (2001). Naming issues in the future of intercultural communication research: The 	contributions of Mark Orbe's co-cultural theory. Paper presented at the annual meeting of the Central States Communication Association, Cincinnati.
Heuman, A. (2001). Multiracial/ethnic identity: A co-cultural approach. Paper presented at the annual meeting of the Central States Communication Association, Cincinnati.
Jun, J. (2012). Why are Asian Americans silent? Asian Americans' negotiation strategies for communicative discriminations. Journal of International and Intercultural Communication, 
Kramarae, C. (1981). Women and Men Speaking. Rowley, MA: Newberry House.
Lapinski, M. K., & Orbe, M. (2007). Evidence for the construct validity and reliability of the Co-Cultural Theory Scales. Communication Methods and Measure. 1(2), 137–164.
Orbe, M. (1996). Laying the foundation for co-cultural communication theory: An inductive approach to studying “non-dominant” communication strategies and the factors that influence them. Communication Studies. 47 (3), 157–176.
Orbe, M. (1997). A Co-cultural communication approach to intergroup relations. Journal of Intergroup Relations. 24, 36–49.
Orbe, M. (1998a). Constructing co-cultural theory: an explication of culture, power, and 	communication. Thousand Oaks, CA: Sage.
Orbe, M. (1998b). From the standpoint(s) of traditionally muted groups: Explicating a co-cultural communication theoretical model. Communication Theory, 8, 1–26.
Orbe, M. and Greer, C. M. (2000). Recognizing the diversity of lived experience: The utility of co-cultural theory in communication and disabilities research. Paper presented at the annual meeting of the Central States Communication Association, Detroit.
Orbe, M. (2004). Co-cultural theory and the spirit of dialogue: A Case study of the 2000-2002 community-based civil rights health project. In. G. M. Chen & W. J. Starosta (Eds.), Dialogue among diversities (pp. 191–211). Washington, DC: National Communication Association.
Orbe, M. and Spellers, R. E. (2005). From the margins to the center: utilizing co-cultural theory in diverse contexts. In W. B. Gudykunst (Ed.), Theorizing about intercultural communication (pp. 173–191). Thousand Oaks, CA: Sage.
Ramirez-Sanchez, R. (2008). Marginalization from Within: Expanding Co-cultural Theory Through the Experience of the Afro Punk. Howard Journal of Communication. 19(2), 89–104.
Smith, D. E. (1987). "The everyday world as problematic: a feminist sociology of knowledge". Boston: Northeastern University Press.
Stanback, M. H. and Pearce, W. B. (1981). Talking to “the man”: Some communication strategies used by members of “subordinate” social groups. Quarterly Journal of Speech. 67, 21–30.

External links
 Western Michigan University School of Communication
 Central States Communication Association

Cultural studies
Communication theory